The Collybrooke or Colly Brook is a brook on Dartmoor in Devon, England. It is a tributary of the River Tavy.

Bibliography
The Painted Stream, Robin Armstrong, Dent, 1985,

See also
Rivers of the United Kingdom

Rivers of Devon
2Collybrooke